"Everybody" is a K-pop song of the complextro-dubstep music genre performed by the South Korean boy group Shinee. Written by Cho Yoon-kyung, two versions of "Everybody" exist: the original Korean-language version, which served as the lead single for the group's fifth Korean EP Everybody (2013), and a Japanese-language version, which was one of the three tracks featured on their ninth Japanese single "3 2 1" (2013). The Korean version of "Everybody" was made available for download on October 14, 2013 under the record label of SM Entertainment and distributing label of EMI Music.

Music video
The music video was released on October 9, 2013. The video showcased the group in an air force military concept, similar to the navy concept of their label mates Girls' Generation's "Genie" era. It was directed by Jang Jae-hyuk, who stated that various techniques and equipment like the steadicam, technocrane and camera matrix, were used to film the music video. The choreography of the song was produced by  Tony Testa. The agency's resident choreographer Gregory Hwang also co-produced the dance moves. The group wore military uniforms designed by Thom Browne.

Critical reception
Billboard K-Town columnist Jeff Benjamin wrote "while finding a delicous balance of hyperactive EDM and pop stylings is commendable, the most impressive point of Shinee's "Everybody" comeback is the choreography - some of 2013's best".

Live performances
The first live performance of "Everybody" was included in the set-list of the Shinee Comeback Special at Gangnam Hallyu Festival on October 6, 2013, in Samseong-dong, Seoul. The performances were streamed on SM Town's YouTube channel. The first broadcast live performance, however, was through Mnet's music show M Countdown on October 10. 2013. This was followed by performances at KBS Music Bank on October 11, MBC Show! Music Core on October 12, SBS Inkigayo on October 13, and MBC Music Show Champion on October 16, 2013.

Japanese version
The Japanese version was included as one of the three tracks on their ninth Japanese single "3 2 1", which was released on December 4, 2013 under the distributing label of Universal Music Japan.

Accolades

Chart performance

References

External links
 

2013 singles
Korean-language songs
Shinee songs
SM Entertainment singles
Gaon Digital Chart number-one singles
Songs written by Thomas Troelsen